Delta Mu Delta is an international honor society that recognizes academic excellence in Baccalaureate, Master's, and Doctorate degree business administration programs at Association of Collegiate Business Schools and Programs (ACBSP)-accredited schools.  It was founded November 18, 1913 by the Dean from Harvard University and four professors from Yale University and New York University.

Symbols
The official badge of the Society is a gold key in the form of a Delta with a ship of commerce with full-blown sails and the Greek letters ΔΜΔ engraved on it.  The ship symbolizes financial success and the advancement of business while the letters stand for the Society's motto, Dia Mathessos, Dynamis ("Through Knowledge, Power"), specifically the power to manage creatively for social and economic good.

Purpose and activities
The purpose of the Delta Mu Delta honor society is to promote higher education in business administration by recognizing and rewarding scholastic accomplishment.  DMD's mission statement, as given by its official website, is as follows:

"Delta Mu Delta is a business honor society that recognizes and encourages academic excellence of students at qualifying colleges and universities to create a DMD community that fosters the well-being of its individual members and the business community through life-time membership."

Affiliations
Since 1963, Delta Mu Delta has been a member of the Association of College Honor Societies.

In January, 1992, the Society signed an exclusive agreement with the Association of Collegiate Business Schools and Programs stating that all future chapters of DMD must be established at ACBSP-accredited colleges and universities.

Delta Mu Delta also maintains close relations with three sister business honor societies:
Sigma Beta Delta - for institutions with state or regional accreditation
Kappa Beta Delta - for ACBSP-accredited two-year institutions
Beta Gamma Sigma - for AACSB-accredited institutions

Active chapters
The list of active Delta Mu Delta chapters.  Note that many former DMD chapters have since become Beta Gamma Sigma chapters as their host institutions have achieved AACSB accreditation.

See also
 Alpha Kappa Psi , professional
 Delta Sigma Pi , professional
 Phi Gamma Nu , professional, originally women's
 Phi Chi Theta , professional, originally women's
 Epsilon Eta Phi , merged into 

 Beta Gamma Sigma , honor, (AACSB schools)
 Pi Omega Pi , honor, business education teachers
 Sigma Beta Delta , honor, (non-AACSB schools)

 Alpha Beta Gamma , honor, (2-yr schools)
 Kappa Beta Delta , honor, (2-yr schools, ACBSP)

 Association of College Honor Societies

References

External links
 Official website
  ACHS Delta Mu Delta entry
  Delta Mu Delta chapter list at ACHS

Association of College Honor Societies
Student organizations established in 1913
1913 establishments in New York (state)